Lyle Ernest Downs (26 July 1896 – 7 July 1921) was an Australian rules footballer who played with Carlton in the Victorian Football League (VFL).
 
Downs, who also played for the Carlton Cricket Club, was a rover and played finals in his first three seasons. He played a game for Carlton with his brother Johnny in 1920.   The brothers were cousins of another Carlton footballer Tommy Downs.

After a training session on 7 July 1921, Downs collapsed and died in the training room of a heart attack.

References

1896 births
Carlton Football Club players
Australian rules footballers from Melbourne
Sport deaths in Australia
1921 deaths
People from Carlton, Victoria
Sports competitors who died in competition